The Hawaiian tropical low shrublands are a tropical savanna ecoregion in the Hawaiian Islands.

Geography

Flora
The ecoregion includes both grasslands and mixed shrublands.  Kāwelu (Eragrostis variabilis), mauu akiaki (Fimbristylis cymosa), akiaki (Sporobolus virginicus), and Lepturus repens are common grassland plants. Shrublands are dominated by ilima (Sida fallax), aalii (Dodonaea viscosa), naupaka (Scaevola spp.), hinahina kū kahakai (Heliotropium anomalum var. argenteum), kīpūkai (Heliotropium curassavicum), mao (Gossypium tomentosum), akoko (Euphorbia spp.), āheahea (Chenopodium oahuense), naio (Myoporum sandwicense), kolokolo kahakai (Vitex rotundifolia), and pūkiawe (Styphelia tameiameiae). More than 90% of the plant species found in this ecoregion are endemic, including ōhai (Sesbania tomentosa), āwiwi (Schenkia sebaeoides), and wahine noho kula (Isodendrion pyrifolium).

Protected areas
Protected areas that cover part of the ecoregion include Koko Head District Park, Diamond Head, Mākua Kea'au Forest Reserve, Ka'ena Point State Park, and Kuaokala Forest Reserve on Oahu.

See also
 
 Hawaiian tropical high shrublands
 List of ecoregions in the United States (WWF)
 Oceanian realm

External link

References

Low shrublands
Tropical and subtropical grasslands, savannas, and shrublands of the United States

Oceanian ecoregions
.
.
.
.
.
.
Natural history of Nihoa
Natural history of the Northwestern Hawaiian Islands